Sing Along Songs for the Damned & Delirious is the second studio album by the Swedish avant-garde metal band Diablo Swing Orchestra. It was released on September 21, 2009 on Ascendance Records. It was produced by In Flames producer Roberto Laghi at IF Studios in Gothenburg, Sweden.

It is the last album to feature Andreas Halvardsson as drummer, and the first with trombonist Daniel Hedin and trumpeter Martin Isaksson. However Hedin and Isaksson joined the band as full-time members in 2011 only, with Sing Along Songs for the Damned & Delirious becoming the last album with the band being a sextet.

All songs are credited to Diablo Swing Orchestra; however, according to singer and guitarist Daniel Håkansson, the songs were mostly written by him and other guitarist Pontus Mantefors.

Track listing

Credits

Band members
 Daniel Håkansson – lead vocals, guitar
 Annlouice Wolgers – lead vocals
 Pontus Mantefors – Lead vocals, guitar,  synthesizer
 Andy Johansson – bass
 Johannes Bergion – cello
 Andreas Halvardsson – drums

Additional musicians
 Daniel Hedin - trombone
 Martin Isaksson - trumpet
 David Werthen - double bass
 Henrik Bergion - piano, accordion, harmonium
 Jonatan Jonsson - clarinet
 Tobias Hedlund - percussion
 Kosma Ranuer - baritone vocals

Production
Roberto Laghi – production
Peter Bergting – cover art

References

2009 albums
Diablo Swing Orchestra albums
Swing revival albums
Symphonic metal albums by Swedish artists